Jabar Karim Mohamad Amin (born 1959) is a Swedish politician and former member of the Riksdag, the national legislature. A member of the Green Party, he represented Västerbotten County between October 2010 and September 2018.

Amin studied mathematics at Umeå University. He has a political science degree from the university. He has been an interpreter, case manager, project manager and business manager. He was a member of the municipal council in Umeå Municipality between 2006 and 2010.

Amin, who is a Kurd, claimed to have nominated Kurdistan Workers' Party leader Abdullah Öcalan for the 2014 Nobel Peace Prize. Amin was meant to be part of the Organization for Security and Co-operation in Europe's election observer group for the 2018 Turkish presidential election but was blocked, along with German MP Andrej Hunko, from entering Turkey.

References

1959 births
Living people
Members of the Riksdag 2010–2014
Members of the Riksdag 2014–2018
Members of the Riksdag from the Green Party
People from Umeå Municipality
Swedish politicians of Kurdish descent
Umeå University alumni